A chondroma is a benign cartilaginous tumor, which is encapsulated with a lobular growing pattern.

Tumor cells (chondrocytes, cartilaginous cells) resemble normal cells and produce the cartilaginous matrix (amorphous, basophilic material).

Presentation
Characteristic features of this tumor include the vascular axes within the tumor, which make the distinction with normal hyaline cartilage.

Diagnosis

Classification
Based upon location, a chondroma can be described as an enchondroma or ecchondroma.
 enchondroma - tumor grows within the bone and expands it
 ecchondroma - grows outward from the bone (rare)

Treatment
- best left alone
- if it causes fractures (enchondroma) or is unsightly it should be removed by curettage and the defect filled with bone graft.

See also 
 Extraskeletal chondroma

References

External links 
 
 Photo in Atlas of Pathology

Benign neoplasms
Osseous and chondromatous neoplasia